Albania participated in the Eurovision Song Contest 2016 in Stockholm, Sweden, with the song "Fairytale" performed by Eneda Tarifa. Its selected entry was chosen through the national selection competition Festivali i Këngës organised by Radio Televizioni Shqiptar (RTSH) in December 2015. Prior to the contest, the song was promoted by a music video and live performances in Israel, the Netherlands and the United Kingdom. Albania was drawn to compete in the second semi-final of the Eurovision Song Contest, which took place on 12 May 2016. Performing as number 17th, the nation was not announced among the top 10 entries of the second semi-final and therefore failed to qualify for the grand final, marking Albania's sixth non-qualification in the contest.

Background 

The first entry was performed by Anjeza Shahini with the song "The Image of You" finishing in the seventh place, the country's second-highest placing to date. The country's national broadcaster, Radio Televizioni Shqiptar (RTSH), organises Festivali i Këngës in order to select the nation's entry for the Eurovision Song Contest. In September 2015, the broadcaster confirmed Albania's participation in the 2016 contest in Stockholm, Sweden.

Before Eurovision

Festivali i Këngës 

Festivali i Këngës 54 was the 54th annual edition of the Albanian music competition Festivali i Këngës and the thirteenth time the competition was used to determine the artist and song that would represent Albania at the Eurovision Song Contest, this time selecting their 2016 contest entry. The competition consisted of two semi-finals on 25 and 26 December 2015 and a final on 27 December 2015, held at the Palace of Congresses in Tirana. The artistic director of the show was Elton Deda, the festival director was Bledar Laço, the screenwriter was Pandi Laço and the music production was led by Edmond Zhulali and Sokol Marsi. All three shows were hosted by Pandi Laço and Blerta Tafani.

The two semi-finals each featured fifteen competing entries. The votes of a jury panel selected eleven entries from each semi-final to advance to the final. In the final, the twenty-two competing entries were voted upon by a jury panel in order to select the winner. The seven-person jury panel consisted of: Pirro Çako, Helidon Haliti, Ilirjan Zhupa, Françesk Radi, Olta Boka, Jehona Sopi and Alban Nimani.
 
RTSH invited interested artists and composers to submit their entries between 29 and 30 September 2015. All songs were required to be in the Albanian language, all performers were required to be at least 16 years of age, and singers and composers could only submit one song while lyricists could only submit two songs. The broadcaster received approximately 70 submissions. On 16 October 2015, RTSH announced the thirty artists and songs selected for the competition by a special committee and among the competing artists were two previous Albanian Eurovision Song Contest entrants: Luiz Ejlli (2006) and Adrian Lulgjuraj (2013). One entry was later withdrawn: "Era" written by Adrian Hila and Pandi Laço and to have been performed by Edea Demaliaj. "Një shishe në oqean" performed by Orgesa Zaimi was named as the replacement entry.

Competing entries 

The competing entries were released to the public online through the broadcaster's website on 4 December 2015. Throughout December 2015, Radio Tirana aired the competing entries and interviewed the artists on the programme Gjithçka Shqip hosted by Andri Xhahu and Artemisa Deda. On 10 December, 40-second promotional video clip montages of all of the entries were released by the broadcaster.

Shows

Semi-finals 

The semi-finals of Festivali i Këngës took place on 25 December and 26 December 2015 and were broadcast live at 20:45 (CET) on the respective dates. 15 songs competed in each semi-final, with 11 entries in the first and second semi-final, respectively, qualifying for the grand final.

Final 

The grand final of Festivali i Këngës took place on 27 December 2015 and was broadcast live at 20:30 (CET). Eneda Tarifa emerged as the winner with "Përrallë" and was simultaneously announced as Albania's representative for the Eurovision Song Contest 2016.

Promotion 

A music video for "Fairytale" premiered via the Eurovision Song Contest's official YouTube channel on 13 March 2016. For further promotion, Tarifa embarked on a small tour with live performances at various Eurovision Song Contest-related events, including in Amsterdam, London and Tel Aviv.

At Eurovision 

The Eurovision Song Contest 2016 took place at the Ericsson Globe in Stockholm, Sweden and consisted of two semi-finals held on 10 and 12 May, respectively, and the grand final on 14 May 2016.

On 26 January 2016, a special allocation draw was held at the City Hall of Stockholm that placed each country into one of the two semi-finals, as well as which half of the show they would perform in. Albania was placed into the second semi-final, to be held on 12 May, and was scheduled to perform in the second half of the show. Once all the competing songs for the 2016 contest had been released, the running order for the semi-finals was decided by the producers of the contest rather than through another draw, for preventing similar songs being placed next to each other; Albania was set to perform at position 18, following  and preceding . However, the nation's performing position shifted to 17, following Romania's disqualification from the contest on 22 April and subsequent removal from the running order of the second semi-final. Eneda performed the song along with three backing vocalists on the main stage. A warm atmosphere was created by a "gold-ground" backdrop and theatrical smoke which gave the act a soft focus effect. Eneda wore a long golden dress with a chapel train that "united" with the golden centre of the stage floor when filmed from above. At the end of the first semi-final, the country was not announced among the top 10 entries in the semi-final and therefore failed to qualify for the grand final, marking Albania's sixth non-qualification in the Eurovision Song Contest. It was later revealed that Albania placed sixteenth in the semi-final, receiving a total of 45 points: 35 points from the televoting and 10 points from the juries.

Voting 

Voting during the three shows was conducted under a new system that involved each country now awarding two sets of points from 1–8, 10 and 12: one from their professional jury and the other from televoting. Each nation's jury consisted of five music industry professionals who are citizens of the country they represent, with their names published before the contest to ensure transparency. This jury judged each entry based on: vocal capacity; the stage performance; the song's composition and originality; and the overall impression by the act. In addition, no member of a national jury was permitted to be related in any way to any of the competing acts in such a way that they cannot vote impartially and independently. The individual rankings of each jury member as well as the nation's televoting results were released shortly after the grand final.

Below is a breakdown of points awarded to Albania and awarded by Albania in the second semi-final and grand final of the contest, and the breakdown of the jury voting and televoting conducted during the two shows:

Points awarded to Albania

Points awarded by Albania

Detailed voting results 
The following members comprised the Albanian jury:
 Edison Misso (jury chairperson)professor of classic guitar at the University of Arts Tirana
 Kejsi Tolasinger, represented Albania in the 2009 contest
 Flamur Shehucomposer
 Nisida Tufajournalist, speaker, producer
 author, lyricist

References

External links  

 

2016
Countries in the Eurovision Song Contest 2016
2015
Eurovision
Eurovision